Cemil Şeboy (born 1953 in Buca, İzmir Turkey) is the former mayor of Buca District of İzmir Province, Turkey.

References

1953 births
Mayors of places in Turkey
Living people
People from Buca
Members of the 25th Parliament of Turkey